Argu languages or Arghu languages is a branch of Common Turkic languages along with Oghuz, Kipchak, Karluk and Siberian Turkic. Unlike other branches, this group is not multilingual. The historical Argu language and its descendant Khalaj are the only languages of this group.

Arghu (Karakhanid: اَرْغوُ), is a bilingual group of Turkic tribes in the 11th century. The first and only mention of Argu tribes and Argu language was Al-Kashgari. He wrote that they lived among the mountains and that is why they were called Argu, meaning "in between".  In the same period (9/10th century), the name Khalaj was also recorded by travelers. With the discovery of modern Khalajs, it is found that language of Khalajs is the same language as Argu language in the Dīwān Lughāt al-Turk.

There are some linguistic reasons that prove that Khalaj is a descendant of the language of Arghu tribes:

 The Old Turkic -ny(-) sound is preserved as -n(-) in both Arghu and Khalaj.
 There is labialization in both. (E.g. bardum, käldüm instead of bardïm, keldim)
 According to Al-Kashgarî, Argu tribes use the word 'dag' to mean 'not'. The only Turkic language that uses the word 'dag' to mean 'not' today is Khalaj. Oghuzs use the words from *degül, and others *ermeŕ.
 Arghu has δ instead of z. This is also seen in Khalaj.

Mahmud Al-Kashgarî also mentioned Khalajs (Karakhanid: خَلَج) in his Divan, but he did not record them as Arghu. In the Turkmen article, it is recorded that Khalajs are actually Turkmen/Oghuz, but they do not consider themselves Oghuz. "...The Turkmens are actually twenty-four tribes, but the Khalajs, which are made up of two tribes, are not considered Oghuz themselves, as they are sometimes separated from them..."

Arghu tribes lived in Talas, Balasagun and Sayram regions. They were adjacent to the Oghuz tribes. According to Al-Kashgari, Oghuzs and Arghus were therefore influenced by each other's languages. The name Khalaj was recorded by Arab geographers around the Syr Darya in Afghanistan in the 9-10th century. Their winter quarters remain in the Talas region. This is the area where the Arghus are located in 11th century. Khwarezmi, along with Kancina, shows the Khalaj Turks as the remaining tribes from the Ephthalites. The Khalaj must have migrated to present-day Iran later. Their homeland, where they were first recorded, is South Central Asia.

References 

Turkic languages